Colonel John Blennerhassett (1691 – 5 May 1775) was an Anglo-Irish politician who represented two constituencies in the Irish House of Commons between 1709 and 1775.

Blennerhassett was born in County Kerry, the eldest son of John Blennerhassett and Margaret Crosbie. He served in the Kerry Militia and was a colonel by 1756. He was first elected as a Member of Parliament in 1709, taking his father's seat representing County Kerry. Between 1713 and 1715, he was MP for Tralee. He was again returned as the MP for Kerry in 1715, serving until 1727. He served as High Sheriff of Kerry in 1717. Between 1727 and 1760, he served as the MP for Tralee, before serving as MP for Kerry for a third period between 1761 and his death in 1775. He was Father of the Irish House of Commons.

He married Jane Denny, with whom he had two sons, John and Arthur, and four daughters, including Mary, who married Lancelot Crosbie, who like his father-in-law was MP for Kerry.

References

1691 births
1775 deaths
Irish MPs 1703–1713
Irish MPs 1713–1714
Irish MPs 1715–1727
Irish MPs 1727–1760
Irish MPs 1761–1768
Irish MPs 1769–1776
People from County Kerry
18th-century Anglo-Irish people
High Sheriffs of Kerry
John
Members of the Parliament of Ireland (pre-1801) for County Kerry constituencies